Al Mukadam (born Ali Mukaddam; April 6, 1984) is a Canadian actor. He is known for his performance as Ray Brennan in the Family Channel television series Radio Free Roscoe (2003–2005).

Career 
Mukadam started his career as a child actor, starring in several Canadian television series, including Mythic Warriors: Guardians of the Legend, Anne of Green Gables: The Animated Series, and Degrassi: The Next Generation. He transitioned into more mature roles with his performance as high school student Ray Brennan in the Family Channel television series Radio Free Roscoe (2003–2005).

In 2015, Mukadam starred in the independent film People Hold On, as part of an ensemble cast that included Chloe Rose, Katie Boland, and Paula Brancati, which was nominated for a Canadian Screen Award. That year, he also starred and co-produced the comedic web series We Are Disorderly, which premiered at a screening in Toronto that was attended by Drake and other Degrassi alum.

In 2016, he appeared in the feature film Miss Sloane, opposite Jessica Chastain. The film had its world premiere at the AFI Fest on November 11, 2016, and also screened at the Napa Valley Film Festival on November 13, 2016.

In 2018, he played a supporting role in the CTV police procedural television series The Detail. It was cancelled after one season.

Filmography

Director 
2008: Mookie's Law (short) (credited as Al Mukadam)
2010: Up & Down (short)
2010: Running Boy (short)
2010: Knock Knock (short)

Producer 
2008: Mookie's Law (short) (credited as Al Mukadam)
2010: Up & Down (short)
2010: Running Boy (short)
2010: Knock Knock (short)
2011: Welcome Back (documentary)

Actor

References

External links

1984 births
20th-century Canadian male actors
21st-century Canadian male actors
Film producers from Ontario
Canadian male child actors
Canadian male film actors
Canadian male television actors
Canadian male voice actors
Canadian male actors of Indian descent
Film directors from Toronto
Canadian Screen Award winners
Living people
Male actors from Toronto
Canadian people of Italian descent